Lək (also, Lyak and Lyak-Ikindzhi) is a village and municipality in the Ujar Rayon of Azerbaijan.  It has a population of 3,494.

References 

Populated places in Ujar District